Local elections were held in Lapu-Lapu City on May 9, 2022 within the Philippine general election. Registered voters of the city will be electing candidates for the following elective local posts: mayor, vice mayor, district representative, and twelve councilors. The city has its own congressional district.

Mayoralty and vice mayoralty elections

Mayor 
Incumbent mayor Junard Chan is vying for a second term. He is running against incumbent representative and former mayor Paz Radaza.

Vice mayor 
Incumbent vice mayor Celedonio Sitoy is vying for a second term. He is running against incumbent city councilor Ricardo Amores. Also running is Reynaldo Canton Jr.

District representative 
Incumbent representative Paz Radaza is vying to return as mayor thereby making the lone district an open seat. Six candidates will compete for the seat including incumbent city councilor Michael Dignos and Maria Cynthia King-Chan, wife of incumbent mayor Junard Chan.

City Council 
Incumbents are expressed in italics.

By ticket

Partido Demokratiko Pilipino-Lakas ng Bayan/Team Libre

Lakas–CMD/Team Deretso

Pederalismo ng Dugong Dakilang Samahan

Partido Lakas ng Masa

Independent

By district 

Key: Italicized: incumbent

References 

2022 Philippine local elections
Elections in Cebu
May 2022 events in the Philippines